Emmanuel Lubezki Morgenstern (born November 30, 1964) is a Mexican cinematographer. He sometimes goes by the nickname Chivo, which means "goat" in Spanish. Lubezki has worked with many acclaimed directors, including Mike Nichols, Tim Burton, Michael Mann, Joel and Ethan Coen, David O. Russell, and frequent collaborators Terrence Malick, Alfonso Cuarón, and Alejandro González Iñárritu.

Lubezki is known for groundbreaking uses of natural lighting and continuous uninterrupted shots in cinematography, often utilizing a Steadicam, a 3-axis gimbal, or hand-held camera to orchestrate fluid, uninterrupted camera movements during particularly significant scenes. Lubezki is a member of both the Mexican Society of Cinematographers and the American Society of Cinematographers. His work has been praised by audiences and critics alike, which earned him multiple awards, including eight Academy Award nominations for Best Cinematography. He won in this category three times, becoming the first person to do so in three consecutive years, for Gravity (2013), Birdman (2014), and The Revenant (2015).

In 2020, he shot and narrated a short film for Apple displaying the camera capabilities of the iPhone 12 Pro, the first device ever to capture, edit and playback in Dolby Vision.

Early life
Lubezki was born to a Jewish family in Mexico City, Mexico. His father was actor and producer Muni Lubezki. His paternal grandfather is Lithuanian Jewish while his grandmother is also Jewish, from Russia. Lubezki studied film at Mexico's Centro Universitario de Estudios Cinematográficos (CUEC), where he met Alfonso Cuarón.

Career
Lubezki began his career in Mexican film and television productions in the late 1980s. His first international production was the 1993 independent film Twenty Bucks, which followed the journey of a single twenty-dollar bill.

Lubezki is a frequent collaborator with fellow Mexican filmmaker Alfonso Cuarón. The two have been friends since they were teenagers and attended the same film school at the National Autonomous University of Mexico. Together they have worked on six motion pictures: Sólo Con Tu Pareja, A Little Princess, Great Expectations, Y Tu Mamá También, Children of Men, and Gravity.
His work with Cuarón on Children of Men (2006) has received universal acclaim. The film utilized a number of new technologies and distinctive techniques. The "roadside ambush" scene was shot in one extended take utilizing a special camera rig invented by Doggicam systems, developed from the company's Power Slide system. For the scene, a vehicle was modified to enable seats to tilt and lower actors out of the way of the camera. The windshield of the car was designed to tilt out of the way to allow camera movement in and out through the front windscreen. A crew of four, including Lubezki, rode on the roof. Children of Men also features a seven-and-a-half-minute battle sequence composed of roughly five seamless edits.

Lubezki won his first Academy Award for Best Cinematography for his work on Cuarón's Gravity, a thriller set in outer space. The film was praised for the way it combined two shots through digital backgrounds of space to create the illusion of scenes done in a single shot. Lubezki won his second Academy Award for Best Cinematography in the following year for his work on Alejandro González Iñárritu's Birdman. The film used a similar technique from Gravity, being very unusual in the way the entire movie was shot so as to appear to be photographed in one continuous take. Lubezki won the award again in 2015 for Iñárritu's The Revenant, becoming a milestone for his third consecutive win and for being the first cinematographer to do so. The film was shot entirely in the wilderness during a cold season, minimizing the amount of CGI and using only natural lighting. It was an extremely difficult process that required a limited amount of time to shoot each scene, which delayed the production, causing budget overruns and changes of locations for proper settings. However, The Revenant earned over $500 million at the box office and received critical acclaim, with much praise for the film's atmospheric tone and realism.

Lubezki won the Royal Photographic Society Lumière Award for major achievement in cinematography, video or animation in 2016.

Filmography

Film

Short films

Television

Awards and nominations

See also
 Cinema of Mexico

References

External links
 
 Internet Encyclopedia of Cinematographers
 International Cinematographers Guild interview

1964 births
Living people
Mexican artists
Mexican cinematographers
Mexican Jews
Mexican people of Russian-Jewish descent
Best Cinematographer Academy Award winners
Best Cinematography BAFTA Award winners
Independent Spirit Award winners
Writers from Mexico City